Madison High School is a public high school located in Madison Heights, Michigan, United States, in Oakland County. Its mascot is the Eagle. It is a part of Madison District Public Schools.

The original high school was built in 1924 to serve students who had attended the one-room school houses in the southern half of what is now Madison Heights.  Its first graduating class, in 1929, consisted of two students.  The Madison School District became a graded district in 1925.

The original high school's gymnasium had its first electric scoreboard in 1941, the result of a magazine sale conducted by the Eagles basketball team.

In 1958 the current Madison High School was built; the former high school is now Wilkinson Middle School.

Notable alumni
Renee Ellmers (1982), Republican U.S. Representative of North Carolina's 2nd congressional district

References

External links
 Official website

Public high schools in Michigan
High schools in Oakland County, Michigan
1924 establishments in Michigan